The 2003 Telefónica World Series by Nissan was contested over 9 race weekends/18 rounds. In this one-make formula all drivers had to use the Dallara chassis (Dallara SN01) and Nissan engines (Nissan VQ). 11 different teams and 28 different drivers competed.

Drivers and Teams

Calendar

Every second race saw a mandatory pit stop.

Final points standings

Driver

For every race the points were awarded: 20 points to the winner, 15 for runner-up, 12 for third place, 10 for fourth place, 8 for fifth place, 6 for sixth place, 4 for seventh place, winding down to 1 point for 10th place. Lower placed drivers did not award points. Additional points were awarded to the driver setting the fastest race lap (2 points). The best 14 race results count, but all additional points count.

 Points System:

Escuderías

External links

Renault Sport Series seasons
World Series by Nissan
World Series by Nissan
World Series by Nissan